Charlotte and Her Boyfriend is a 13-minute 1958 film by Franco-Swiss director Jean-Luc Godard. It is shot entirely in or from a hotel room, in which Jules (Jean-Paul Belmondo) gives Charlotte (Anne Collette) a seemingly endless and self-indulgent tirade on her faults and his tribulations. Belmondo's voice is in fact dubbed by Godard.

It is a homage to Jean Cocteau's successful one-act play , where the roles are opposite.

It can be seen on the Criterion and Optimum DVDs of À Bout de Souffle.

Cast
 Jean-Paul Belmondo as Jules
 Gérard Blain as The New Boyfriend
 Anne Collette as Charlotte
 Jean-Luc Godard as Jules (voice)

References

External links 
 
Film page at Le Film Guide

Films directed by Jean-Luc Godard
1958 films
French short films
1958 drama films
1950s French-language films
French black-and-white films
1950s French films